Escape Pod may refer to:

Escape pod, a capsule or craft used to escape in an emergency
Escape Pod (podcast), an audio podcast science fiction magazine